In Pakistan, on average around over a 1000 underage girls belonging to the minority Hindu, Christian and Sikh communities are kidnapped and forcefully converted to Islam every year and forcibly married and subjected to rape. According to human rights organisations hundreds of Hindu, Sikh, Christian girls are abducted and converted every year. The National Council of Churches in Pakistan (NCCP) said that the number of abductions of Christian girls is increasing every year. Alleged forced conversions of girls belonging to the Kalash community were also reported in media. Most of the targets are Hindu and Christian girls from lower Castes and poor families. Such cases of forced conversions are being reported increasingly in the Southern Sindh districts of Tharparkar, Umerkot and Mirpur Khas and in the South Punjab, particularly the Rahim Yar Khan District and adjacent areas. Some of these victims are allegedly as young as 12 years old.

A Pakistani journalist, writing in an Indian newspaper, The Hindu, alleged that "Wealthy Muslim farmers see [Hindu girls] as fair game for abductions, rape, and prolonged sexual exploitation in captivity. Some notorious religious establishments proudly validate these alleged crimes. State institutions, the police and politicians have encouraged the trend by looking the other way." Harris Khalique claimed that "madrassas provide an institutional backing and that cannot happen if the state does not allow that. I rest the responsibility of such incidents squarely on the state, which fails its citizens."

Many Hindu girls living in Pakistan are kidnapped, forcibly converted and married to Muslims. According to the Pakistan Hindu Council, religious persecution, especially forced conversions, remains the foremost reason for migration of Hindus from Pakistan. Religious institutions like Bharchundi Sharif and Sarhandi Pir support forced conversions and are known to have support and protection of ruling political parties of Sindh. According to the National Commission of Justice and Peace and the Pakistan Hindu Council around 1000 Christian and Hindu minority women are converted to Islam and then forcibly married off to their abductors or rapists. This practice is being reported increasingly in the districts of Tharparkar, Umerkot and Mirpur Khas in Sindh. According to another report from the Movement for Solidarity and Peace, about 1,000 non-Muslim girls are converted to Islam each year in Pakistan. According to the Amarnath Motumal, the vice chairperson of the Human Rights Commission of Pakistan, every month, an estimated 20 or more Hindu girls are abducted and converted, although exact figures are impossible to gather. In 2014 alone, 265 legal cases of forced conversion were reported mostly involving Hindu girls.

According to the Pakistan's 2017 Universal Periodic Review to the UN Office of the United Nations High Commissioner for Human Rights (OHCHR), an average 20 of Hindu girls are abducted every month in Pakistan, converted by force to Islam, and then married off to their abductors.

Within Pakistan, the southern province of Sindh had over 1,000 forced conversions of Christian and Hindu girls according to the annual report of the Human Rights Commission of Pakistan in 2018. According to victims' families and activists, Mian Abdul Haq, who is a local political and religious leader in Sindh, has been accused of being responsible for forced conversions of girls within the province.

More than 100 Hindus in Sindh converted to Islam in June 2020 to escape discrimination and economic pressures. Islamic charities and clerics offer incentives of jobs or land to impoverished minorities on the condition that they convert. New York Times summarised the view of Hindu groups that these seemingly voluntary conversions "take place under such economic duress that they are tantamount to a forced conversion anyway."

Forbes reported that the Human rights organizations estimates that every year 1,000 such girls are forcibly converted to Islam. This estimate could be even higher than 1,000 as many cases remain unreported. The 2020 US media report also estimates the number of forcibly converted girls to be around 1,000 per year. However the Pakistan government rejected it and termed the report as "rubbish and baseless". The Catholic news site Aleteia reported that in 2020, the number of forced conversion cases rose to more than 2000.

Incidents
In 2003, a six-year-old Sikh girl was kidnapped by a member of the Afridi tribe in Northwest Frontier Province; the alleged kidnapper claimed the girl was actually 12-years-old, and had converted to Islam so therefore could not be returned to her non-Muslim family.
On January 4, 2005, 16 year old Hemi and 18 year old Marvi were kidnapped from Kunri village in Umerkot district.
On March 3, 2005, 14 year old Raji was kidnapped from Aslam Town Jhuddo in Mirpurkhas District.
On December 22, 2005, 13 year old Mashu was kidnapped from Jhaluree village in Mirpur Khas District.
On July 23, 2006, 15 year-old Pooja was kidnapped from Lyari town in Karachi District. A judge ruled that she should be released and although she was, she was kidnapped again and has been missing ever since.
On August 2, 2006, 16 year old Komal was kidnapped from Hawks bay in Karachi District.
On December 31, 2006, 17 year old Deepa was kidnapped from Tharparkar district in Sindh province.
In May 2007, members of the Christian community of Charsadda in the North West Frontier Province of Pakistan, close to the border of Afghanistan, reported that they had received letters threatening bombings if they did not convert to Islam, and that the police were not taking their fears seriously.
In June 2009, International Christian Concern (ICC) reported the rape and killing of a Christian man in Pakistan, for refusing to convert to Islam.
Rinkle Kumari, a 19-year Pakistani student, Lata Kumari, and Asha Kumari, a Hindu working in a beauty parlor, were allegedly forced to convert from Hinduism to Islam. Their cases were appealed all the way to the Supreme Court of Pakistan. The appeal was admitted but remained unheard ever after.
On September 23, 2014, Joti Kumari, a student of Electrical Engineering was kidnapped from Larkana City in Sindh District.
A total of 57 Hindus converted in Pasrur during May 14–19. On May 14, 35 Hindus of the same family were forced to convert by their employer because his sales dropped after Muslims started boycotting his eatable items as they were prepared by Hindus as well as their persecution by the Muslim employees of neighbouring shops according to their relatives. Since the impoverished Hindus had no other way to earn and needed to keep the job to survive, they converted. 14 members of another family converted on May 17 since no one was employing them, later another Hindu man and his family of eight under pressure from Muslims converted to Islam to avoid their land being grabbed.
In 2017, the Sikh community in Hangu district of Pakistan's Khyber-Pakhtunkhwa province alleged that they were “being forced to convert to Islam” by a government official. Farid Chand Singh, who filed the complaint, has claimed that Assistant Commissioner Tehsil Tall Yaqoob Khan was allegedly forcing Sikhs to convert to Islam and the residents of Doaba area are being tortured religiously.
On April 29, 2017, a 17 year old, Priya Kaur, a Sikh girl was kidnapped from Buner district.
In June, 2017, 16-year-old Ravita Meghwar was kidnapped in Sindh.
Hindu sisters Reena and Raveena became the face of forced religious conversion in Pakistan in 2019. It prompted the Indian External Affairs Ministry to ask Pakistan to submit a report about it.
January, 2019, 16 year old Anusha Kumari was kidnapped and the Indian High Commission took up the matter, but no action was taken.
A Sikh girl, kidnapped and married to a Muslim is yet to return home despite the Governor of Punjab assuring to send her back to her parents in 2019.
In 2020, Mehak Kumari a 15-year-old Hindu girl was kidnapped, forcibly converted and married to a Muslim man. She was later rescued by the police. The Court ordered her to be sent to a Women's protection centre. In the court she said that she didn't want to convert and to be sent back to her parents' house. Soon after, Islamic clerics in Pakistan demanded the beheading of Mehak Kumari for renouncing Islam after being converted.
A bride was allegedly kidnapped with the help of the police in January 2020 from her wedding and forcibly married to a Muslim.
In 2020, a 14-year-old Christian girl was allegedly abducted, converted to Islam and married off to a Muslim man in Karachi. However, in the court, the judges maintained that the girl has already had her first menstrual cycle and under the Islamic Shariah Law she should be considered an adult, making her marriage with her abductor legal and justified.

On 18 October 2005, Sanno Amra and Champa, a Hindu couple residing in the Punjab Colony, Karachi, Sindh returned home to find that their three teenage daughters had disappeared. After inquiries to the local police, the couple discovered that their daughters had been taken to a local madrassah, had been converted to Islam, and were denied unsupervised contact with their parents. In January 2017, a Hindu temple was demolished in Pakistan's Haripur district.

In July, 2021 over 60 Hindus were converted to Islam in Mirpur Khas District and Mithi areas of Sindh.

On 3 January 2020, Pakistani media reported that "scores of protesters surrounded the Gurdwara Nankana Sahib, on Friday afternoon, threatening to overrun the holy site if their demands for the release of suspects in an alleged forced conversion case were not met". There were also reports of stone-pelting on the shrine by a mob of angry local Muslims, that even threatened to convert it into a mosque.

In May 2007, members of the Christian community of Charsadda in the North West Frontier Province of Pakistan, close to the border of Afghanistan, reported that they had received letters threatening bombings if they did not convert to Islam, and that the police were not taking their fears seriously.

Rinkle Kumari, a 19-year Pakistani student, Lata Kumari, and Asha Kumari, a Hindu working in a beauty parlor, were allegedly forced to convert from Hinduism to Islam. They told the judge that they wanted to go with their parents. Their cases were appealed all the way to the Supreme Court of Pakistan. The appeal was admitted but remained unheard ever after. Rinkle was abducted by a gang and "forced" to convert to Islam, before being head shaved.

Sikhs in Hangu district stated they were being pressured to convert to Islam by Yaqoob Khan, the assistant commissioner of Tall Tehsil, in December 2017. However, the Deputy Commissioner of Hangu Shahid Mehmood denied it occurred and claimed that Sikhs were offended during a conversation with Yaqub though it was not intentional.

A total of 57 Hindus converted in Pasrur during May 14–19. On May 14, 35 Hindus of the same family were forced to convert by their employer because his sales dropped after Muslims started boycotting his eatable items as they were prepared by Hindus as well as their persecution by the Muslim employees of neighbouring shops according to their relatives. Since the impoverished Hindu had no other way to earn and needed to keep the job to survive, they converted. 14 members of another family converted on May 17 since no one was employing them, later another Hindu man and his family of eight under pressure from Muslims to avoid their land being grabbed.

In 2017, the Sikh community in Hangu district of Pakistan's Khyber-Pakhtunkhwa province alleged that they were "being forced to convert to Islam" by a government official. Farid Chand Singh, who filed the complaint, has claimed that Assistant Commissioner Tehsil Tall Yaqoob Khan was allegedly forcing Sikhs to convert to Islam and the residents of Doaba area are being tortured religiously. According to reports, about 60 Sikhs of Doaba had demanded security from the administration.

Many Hindus convert to Islam in order to acquire Watan Cards and National Identification Cards. These converts are also given land and money. For example, 428 poor Hindus in Matli were converted between 2009 and 2011 by the Madrassa Baitul Islam, a Deobandi seminary in Matli, which pays off the debts of Hindus converting to Islam. Another example is the conversion of 250 Hindus to Islam in Chohar Jamali area in Thatta. Conversions are also carried out by Ex Hindu Baba Deen Mohammad Shaikh mission which converted 108,000 people to Islam since 1989.

In October 2020, the Pakistani High Court upheld the validity of a forced marriage between 44-year-old Ali Azhar and 13-year-old Christian Arzoo Raja. Raja was abducted by Azhar, forcibly wed to Azhar and then forcibly converted to Islam by Azhar.

On March 21, 2022, another Hindu girl was shot dead in Rohri, Sukkur, Sind for resisting her abduction.

On August 17, 2022, the kidnapping of another minor Christian girl who was forced to say that she had married her Muslim captor out of her own free will in Court after threats to the life of her brothers was reported.

Reasons
According to the Child Protection activists, these forced conversions money-making network which involves Islamic clerics who solemnize the marriages, magistrates who legalize the unions and corrupt local police who aid the culprits by refusing to investigate or sabotaging investigations. According to the Child Protection activist Jibran Nasir, these forced conversions are part of a mafia that preys on vulnerable minority girls for older men with pedophilia urges. The Pakistan Muslim League politician Haresh Chopra has stated that abduction and forced conversion of Hindus and Sikhs girls is a business in Pakistan done by organized gangs of mullahs and terrorists.

The culprit involved in forcibly converting a non-Muslim girl to Islam believe that they will earn a place in heaven, according to the Amarnath Motumal, vice chairperson of the Sindh Chapter of Pakistan's Human Rights Commission. Pakistan doesn't have stronger legislation to prevent forced conversions and due to this these forced conversions go unabated.

Islamic institutions and clerics like Abdul Haq (Mitthu Mian) (politician and caretaker of Bharchundi Shareef Dargah) and Pir Ayub Jan Sirhindi (caretaker of Dargah pir sarhandi) are alleged involved in these forced conversions and are known to have support from the ruling political parties of Sindh.

Some conversions are forced while some conversions are due to discrimination of poor Hindus in jobs, government facilities and conversion to Islam is seen as a way to avoid religious discrimination and violence.

Consequences
A survey conducted by the Pakistan Hindu Seva welfare Trust found that majority of the scheduled caste Hindu families doesn't send their girl children to schools due to the fear of forced conversion. According to the, Ramesh Kumar Vankwani, member of National Assembly of Pakistan, around 5,000 Hindus are migrating from Pakistan to India every year and the forced conversions are one of the major reasons behind this. According to the Pakistan Hindu Council, forced conversions is the foremost reason for the declining population of Hindus in Pakistan. Hindus in Sindh live in fear, due to forced marriage of Hindu girls to Muslim men. Many Pakistani Hindus migrate to India due to forced conversions.

Legal responses

Pakistan doesn't have stronger legislation to prevent forced conversions and due to this these forced conversions go unabated.

In November 2016, a bill against forced conversion was passed unanimously by the Sindh Provisional Assembly. However, the bill failed to make it into law as the Governor returned the bill. The Bill was effectively blocked by the Islamist groups and parties like the Council of Islamic Ideology and Jamaat-e-Islami. In 2019, a bill against forced conversion was proposed by Hindu politicians in the Sindh assembly, but was turned down by the ruling Pakistan Peoples Party lawmakers. In 2020 "Protection of the Rights of Religious Minorities Bill" was introduced in the Senate of Pakistan that could prevent forced conversions of minority girls, but it was turned down by the Senate Standing Committee on Religious Affairs and Interfaith Harmony chaired by Jamiat Ulema-e-Islam (F) (JUI-F) senator Abdul Ghafoor Haideri. Krishna Kumari Kolhi, a Pakistan Peoples Party (PPP) Senator, walked out of the Senate during the meeting as a form of protest.

Response

The Pakistani Nobel Laurette Malala Yousafzai spoke against forced conversions in Pakistan and said "It should be a personal choice and no one, especially a child shouldn’t be forced to accept any faith or convert to any other religion out of the will," The Pakistani Prime minister Imran Khan has said that forced conversions are 'un-Islamic' and are against the commands of Allah. The Deputy Leader of Conservative Party of Canada Candice Bergen has said that "The reports coming out of Pakistan of Christian and Hindu girls being abducted, raped, forced into marriages and coerced to convert from their faith are deeply concerning and need to be addressed". She also called for the re-establishment of Office of Religious Freedom in Canada to address the issue.

Pakistan has no law to stop forced conversion. The Pakistani minority groups protested when Pakistani parliamentary committee rejected the anti forced conversion bill.

The All Pakistan Hindu Panchayat (APHP) general secretary, who in an interview with The Times of India said the "majority of cases of marriages between Hindu women and Muslim men were result of love affairs. He claimed that due to honor, the family members of women concoct stories of abduction and forced conversions". While the general secretary admitted that there were incidents of abductions and forced conversions of Hindu girls, he claimed that those incidents are not in large numbers.

See also
 Asia Bibi blasphemy case
 Freedom of religion in Pakistan
 Religion in Pakistan

References

Islam in Pakistan
Islam and children
Islam and women
Islam and slavery
Islam and violence
Persecution of Hindus
Persecution of Sikhs
Persecution by Muslims
Child abduction in Pakistan
Forced religious conversion
Anti-Hindu violence in Pakistan
Violence against women in Pakistan